Chronicles of the Ghostly Tribe is a 2015 Chinese 3D adventure action film directed and co-written by Lu Chuan, and stars Mark Chao, Yao Chen, Rhydian Vaughan, Li Chen, Tiffany Tang and Daniel Feng. The film is an adaptation of Zhang Muye's 2006 best-selling novel Ghost Blows Out the Light. Chronicles of the Ghostly Tribe was released in China on September 30, 2015.

Synopsis
In 1979, a young soldier is working in China's snow capped Kunlun mountains when an explosion reveals bizarre fossils hidden deep in the mountain caverns. What they discover next will change his life and human history forever.

Cast
 Mark Chao as Hu Bayi, former soldier/adventurer.
 Yao Chen as Yang Ping/Shirley Yang, daughter of Professor Yang.
 Rhydian Vaughan as Chen Dong, scientist/student of Professor Yang.
 Li Chen as Mr. Wang/President Wang, librarian/guardian of Prince Yi's mausoleum.
 Tiffany Tang as Cao Weiwei.
 Daniel Feng as Wang Kaixuan, locally famous singer & childhood friend of Hu Bayi.
 Li Guangjie as Han Jiuyang.
 Wang Qingxiang as Professor Yang, archaeologist/expert on the Demon Temple & ghostly tribe.
 Wu Jun
 Wang Deshun as An Liman, a geographer.

Production
This film was shot in Gansu.

Chronicles of the Ghostly Tribe'''s photographer was Cao Yu, who is Yao Chen's husband.

Release
The film was released in theaters in China on September 30, 2015.

Reception
The film made US$14.2 million on its opening day in China on Wednesday, September 30, 2015 placing first at the daily box office. During its opening weekend, it earned US$34 million ranking second at the Chinese box office behind Lost in Hong Kong''.

References

External links
 
 
 

Chinese action adventure films
Chinese fantasy adventure films
Films shot in Gansu
2010s action adventure films
2010s fantasy adventure films
Chinese 3D films
2015 3D films
Films based on Chinese novels
2015 films
Films directed by Lu Chuan
Ghost Blows Out the Light
Films set in the 1980s